The 2016 American Solar Challenge (ASC) was an intercollegiate solar car race on July 30 – August 6, 2016. The event was won by the University of Michigan. It was the 13th American national championship solar car race held.

Route
Day 1: Sat, July 30: Start in Brecksville, Ohio; must reach Dayton, OH checkpoint.
Day 2: Sun, July 31: Finish in Vincennes, Indiana.
Day 3: Mon, August 1: Start in Vincennes, IN; must reach St. Louis, Missouri checkpoint.
Day 4: Tue, August 2: Finish in Republic, MO.
Day 5: Wed, August 3: Start in Republic, MO; must reach Beatrice, Nebraska checkpoint.
Day 6: Thu, August 4: Must reach Gering, NE checkpoint.
Day 7: Fri, August 5: Finish in Scottsbluff, NE.
Day 8: Sat, August 6: Start in Scottsbluff, NE; finish in Hot Springs, South Dakota.

Results

Overall

Inspector Awards
Spirit of the Event: Minnesota
Abraham Poot Teamwork: Appalachian State
Safety: Poly Montreal
Overcoming Adversity: Iowa State
Array: Missouri S&T
Mechanical: Michigan
Electrical: Missouri S&T
Dynamics: Iowa State
Fastest Egress: Appalachian State

Stage 1

Stage 2

Stage 3

Stage 4

References

External links
 2016 American Solar Challenge

American Solar Challenge